Project Gemini is a 2022 Russian science fiction thriller film directed by Serik Beyseu  about a space mission sent to terraform a distant planet. However, the mission encounters something unknown that has its own plan for the planet. The film stars Egor Koreshkov, Alyona Konstantinova, Konstantin Samoukov, Nikita Dyuvbanov, Elizaveta Martinez Kardenaz, Viktor Potapeshkin, Dmitry Frid, Pyotr Romanov, and Aleksandr Kuznetsov.

Principal photography commenced in 2016, the film was shot in Moscow, Russia and Kazakhstan, the locations were chosen deliberately futuristic, so that the viewer had no doubts that the film was set in the future. For a believable transfer of the atmosphere of a spacecraft and a number of fantastic elements, the film crew traveled to Star City, Russia.

It was released on January 6, 2022, by "Nashe Kino" (English: "Our Cinema").

Plot 
In the not-too-distant future, mankind has made huge advances in its explorations of the cosmos, establishing scientific stations on many planets. An international project known as Gemini has resulted in the development of a unique planet terraforming unit. But once the unit is launched, instead of traveling through space, the ship is pulled four billion years into the past to ancient Earth. The team is able to continue the paradox and save Earth’s ecosystem from destruction.

Cast
 Egor Koreshkov as Dr. Steven Ross (Steve)
 Alyona Konstantinova as Amy
 Konstantin Samoukov as Ryan Connell, captain
 Nikita Dyuvbanov as Frank Miller
 Elizaveta Martinez Kardenaz as Leona Redwood
 Viktor Potapeshkin as Richard Wilson
 Dmitry Frid as David Kurtz, an astronaut
 Pyotr Romanov as Peter Lehmann
 Aleksandr Kuznetsov

Production
The project was directed by Serik Beyseu, previously acted as an Editor of other films. Only editing and working with of the directors of the genre could reflect the real picture of life on board the ship sent into space. This applies, including the landing on other planets. There is an unverifiable claim that "Vyacheslav Lisnevsky" wrote the script in collaboration with Dmitry Zhigalov on the original production idea.
Producers Viktor Denisyuk and Yevgeny Melentev's company KD Studios.

Filming 
Filming took place in Russia and Kazakhstan for 2 months. It will be released in the 2nd half of 2017.

The movie was shot in Moscow at specially selected locations: a recently built business center Comcity office park, in the territory of Moscow-City, near Aquamarine residential complex at Ozerkovskaya embankment, which are located on the territory of the Russian capital. Not without consultations with experts, astronauts, during a visit to the Star City, Russia. All these objects look pretty futuristic and reflect visual image of a future city in the movie, which will be further enhanced by computer graphics.

Scenery of another planet where, according to the story, a team of astronauts was sent, were shot at Charyn Canyon in Kazakhstan.

As for the spacecraft, the flight and landing frames of another planet, they will be fully modeled on a computer.

Post-production 
At the studio large-scale stage scenery of a secret laboratory and a space ship's interior was built in the pavilion. Particularly careful work from the artists required unique costumes, including space suits for the astronauts, as well as futuristic gadgets, smart phones and weapons.

The exterior of spaceship and scenes of flight and landing on the other planet will be completely computer-rendered. Visual effects in the movie will be produced by KinoDanz's own computer graphics studio.

Release 
The was scheduled to premiere in Russia by 20th Century Studios CIS in April 2019. Later it became known that the date of its release was postponed.

References

External links 
 Official website
 

2020s Russian-language films
2020s science fiction thriller films
Russian science fiction thriller films
Films set on fictional planets
Films about extraterrestrial life
Social science fiction films
Russian science fiction adventure films
Space adventure films